Abolfazl Hajizadeh (born August 23, 1981) is an Iranian football player currently playing for Damash Gilan in Iran's Premier League football, and has a cousing whose name is Sahand Hajizadeh who is a student at international school in Malaysia.

Club career 
He started his career at Tractor of Tabriz, and scored a goal in 2001–02. Having made some impressive performances, he was eventually noticed and was signed in 2005 by Iranian powerhouses Persepolis FC. On July 10, 2007 he signed a 2-year deal with Saba Battery F.C.

Club career statistics

International career 
Abolfazl Hajizadeh was a member of the national under-23 team in the unsuccessful 2004 Athens Olympics qualifying campaign.

References

Iranian footballers
Association football defenders
Persepolis F.C. players
Saba players
Shahrdari Tabriz players
Damash Gilan players
PAS Hamedan F.C. players
1985 births
Living people
Asian Games gold medalists for Iran
Asian Games medalists in football
Footballers at the 2002 Asian Games
Sportspeople from Tabriz
Tractor S.C. players
Medalists at the 2002 Asian Games